Katon Edwards Dawson (born February 29, 1956) is an American politician from the state of South Carolina, former chairman of the South Carolina Republican Party and was a 2009 candidate for chairman of the Republican National Committee.

Early life
Dawson was born in Columbia, South Carolina in then-heavily Democratic South Carolina, his parents helped organize the state's first GOP precincts. Dawson says his political interest came from attending a Barry Goldwater speech in 1964, and first volunteered for Richard Nixon's 1968 presidential campaign.

Dawson graduated from the University of South Carolina.

Political career
Dawson was elected Richland County GOP vice chairman in 1994 and state party chair 2002.

In 2006, despite nationwide losses by the Republican party, the South Carolina GOP carried eight of nine statewide constitutional offices.

In August 2007 Dawson drew national attention for his decision to move the 2008 South Carolina Republican presidential primary from Feb. 2 to January 29, preserving the state's "first in the South" primary. In every election since 1980, the winner of the South Carolina primary has won the Republican presidential nomination, except in 2012 when Newt Gingrich won the primary and did not secure the nomination.

During Dawson's chairmanship, the South Carolina GOP has made progress with outreach to African-Americans and in promoting minorities to leadership positions, electing its first African-American member of the Republican National Committee from the South, and in 2008 the first black Republican State Representative since Reconstruction was elected.

Dawson became the first state Republican chair to endorse the "Drill Here. Drill Now. Pay Less." campaign launched by former House Speaker Newt Gingrich's organization American Solutions.

Dawson expressed his interest in chairing the Republican National Committee in October 2007 when reports confirmed Senator Mel Martinez would be stepping down, but did not actively campaign until he announced his official bid on November 24, 2008 for the 2009 RNC Chairmanship Election. Dawson was one of two candidates to earn votes on each of the six votes taken; he lost the final ballot to winner Michael Steele, 91-77. It was reported that in September 2008 Dawson resigned his membership in the Forest Lake Club, a  whites-only country club located in Columbia, South Carolina, amid controversy. A 2017 Guardian article, though, states "It was later discovered that he had remained a member the whole time."

RNC Chairman Vote

Source: CQPolitics, and Poll Pundit 

 Candidate won that Round of voting
 Candidate withdrew
 Candidate won RNC Chairmanship

Personal life
Dawson lives with his wife Candy in Columbia, S.C. They have two children, Anna and Katon Jr.

See also

South Carolina Republican Party

References

External links
Message from SCGOP Chairman Katon Dawson—official South Carolina Republican Party website
Raleigh-Durham News & Observer Katon Dawson tag index
USA Today Katon Dawson tag index
The Next Right Katon Dawson tag index

1956 births
2008 United States presidential electors
Living people
Politicians from Columbia, South Carolina
South Carolina Republicans
State political party chairs of South Carolina
University of South Carolina alumni